was one of 18   escort destroyers built for the Imperial Japanese Navy (IJN) during World War II. Completed in late 1944, little is known about her activities during the rest of the war. The ship was surrendered to the Allies at the end of the war and used to repatriate Japanese troops until 1947. Mid-year the destroyer was turned over to the United States and was later sunk as a target.

Design and description
Designed for ease of production, the Matsu class was smaller, slower and more lightly armed than previous destroyers as the IJN intended them for second-line duties like escorting convoys, releasing the larger ships for missions with the fleet. Their crew numbered 210 officers and enlisted men. The ships had two Kampon geared steam turbines, each driving one propeller shaft, using steam provided by two Kampon water-tube boilers.

The main armament of the Matsu-class ships consisted of three  Type 89 dual-purpose guns in one twin-gun mount aft and one single mount forward of the superstructure. The single mount was partially protected against spray by a gun shield. The accuracy of the Type 89 guns was severely reduced against aircraft because no high-angle gunnery director was fitted. The ships carried a total of twenty-five  Type 96 anti-aircraft guns in 4 triple and 13 single mounts. The Matsus were equipped with Type 13 early-warning and Type 22 surface-search radars. The ships were also armed with a single rotating quadruple mount amidships for  torpedoes. They could deliver their 36 depth charges via two stern rails and two throwers.

Construction and career

Authorized in the late 1942 Modified 5th Naval Armaments Supplement Program, Keyaki (Japanese elm) was laid down on 22 June 1944 at the Yokosuka Naval Arsenal and launched on 30 September. Upon her completion on 15 December, the ship was assigned to Destroyer Squadron 11 of the Combined Fleet for training. On 15 March the ship was reassigned to the squadron's Destroyer Division 53. The squadron was briefly attached to the Second Fleet from 1–20 April before rejoining the Combined Fleet.

The division was disbanded on 15 July and Keyaki was assigned to the Osaka Guard District. The ship was turned over to Allied forces at Yokosuka at the time of the surrender of Japan on 2 September and was stricken from the navy list on 5 October. The destroyer was disarmed and used to repatriate Japanese personnel from late 1945 to 1947. Keyaki was turned over to the United States on 5 July of the latter year and was subsequently sunk as a target.

Notes

Bibliography

 
 

Matsu-class destroyers
Ships built by Yokosuka Naval Arsenal
World War II destroyers of Japan
1944 ships
Ships sunk as targets